Burial at sea is the disposal of human remains in the ocean, normally from a ship or boat. It is regularly performed by navies, and is done by private citizens in many countries.

Burial-at-sea services are conducted at many different locations and with many different customs, either by ship or by aircraft. Usually, either the captain of the ship or aircraft or a religious representative (of the deceased's religion or the state religion) performs the ceremony.

The ceremony may include burial in a casket, burial sewn in sailcloth, burial in an urn, or scattering of the cremated remains from a ship. Burial at sea by aircraft is only done with cremated remains. Other types of burial at sea include the mixing of the ashes with concrete and dropping the concrete block to form an artificial reef such as the Atlantis Reef.

Below is a list of religions that allow burial at sea, with some details of the burial.

By religion

Christianity
In Christianity, the practice is accepted. It has specific liturgies for burial at sea.

Catholicism
Officially, the Roman Catholic Church prefers normal casket burials over cremations, but does allow for burials at sea of whole or cremated remains. The Church defines burial at sea as sinking remains in a worthy container to the sea bottom and final resting place. Burial at sea in a casket or in an urn is acceptable and not prohibited, but viewed as not preferable and should not be commonplace. Cremated remains are subject to the condition that the ashes are entombed in an mausoleum urn niche, columbarium, or buried on land or sea. Catholics believe it is not proper to scatter or pour the cremated remains over the sea, water, or on the land. According to the Roman Catholic Church this action does not give due respect to the remains of the deceased, nor does it allow for the closure, healing of family and friends, and prayers for the deceased. Likewise they see that the custom of housing the remains with family or friends and not placing the deceased in the ground does not offer loved ones a specific and sacred place to visit the deceased's remains. Visiting the deceased in a holy place provides believers with a space to offer prayers, commune with those who have gone before them in faith, and reminds them to await the resurrection of their own bodies. For burials at sea, the committal prayer number 406§4 is used in the funeral liturgy.

Eastern Orthodoxy
At Orthodox funerals, there is normally an open casket at the ceremony. At the grave site, there is a short prayer, after which attendants to place flowers on the casket. A memorial service is typically held on the Sunday closest to the 40th day after death. Cremation is not approved, as bodies are sought to be preserved in burial as much as is feasible, for preparation of the general resurrection of the dead at the Second Advent.

Protestantism
The Anglican Communion has detailed procedures for burial at sea. The ship has to be stopped, and the body has to be sewn in canvas, and suitably weighted. 

At the burial of the dead at sea, the same office from the Book of Common Prayer as used for burial on land may be used; only instead of the words:
  
the form of words used is:

Anglican, and other, chaplains of the Royal Navy also bury cremated remains of deceased naval personnel at sea. Scattering of cremated remains is discouraged, not least for practical reasons. 

Many Lutheran naval veterans and seamen prefer to be buried at sea. In those cases either the casket or urn is set to sea, or ashes scattered. The procedure is similar as that with the Anglican church. Some parishes have specific consecrated sea areas where ashes can be sprinkled.

Hinduism

Traditionally, the deceased are cremated, the bones and ashes are collected, and the ashes/remains are immersed in the Ganges River if possible or in any other river if not.

Islam
The sacred texts of Islam prefer burial on land, "so deep that its smell does not come out and the beasts of prey do not dig it out". However, if a person dies at sea and it is not possible to bring the body back to land before decay, or if burial at land becomes impossible, burial at sea is allowed. A weight is tied to the feet of the body, and the body is lowered into the water. This would preferably occur in an area where the remains are not immediately eaten by scavengers.

In the Sunni Fiqh book Umdat al-Salik wa Uddat al-Nasik, the condition for sea burial is:

Judaism
According to Jewish law, dead people must be quickly buried and burial requires covering in earth. This law is derived from Devarim (Deuteronomy) 21:23 "Bury, you will bury him the same day; for the (unburied body) is a curse to God" the double command to bury causing a positive commandment to entomb in the earth and a negative commandment forbidding leaving an unburied body. The legal text Shulchan Aruch brings a case example explaining that even if a person is known to have drowned in a closed body of water such as a small pond where there can be certainty that the victim had not somehow survived, the family does not begin ritual mourning and remains in extended state of most intense mourning aninut until either the body is found or after an exhaustive search despairs of recovering and burying the body. This shows that the body is considered unburied when underwater; as shiva mourning normally only begins after burial. B'resheit (Genesis) 3:19 states "With the sweat of your face you shall eat bread, until you return to the ground, from (dust) you were taken and you are dust, and to dust you will return." From this it has been deduced by rabbis that the only proper treatment of a dead body is physically to cover it with earth once land is available for the crew to bury the body, rather than to leave the body at sea or some other fate such as cremation.

If for some reason the body of someone deceased aboard a ship causes an immediate life threat to those aboard the vessel the commandment to protect innocent life or pikuach nefesh overrides nearly all commandments including the command to bury the dead, as any appropriate actions to ensure safety of surviving crew are required to be taken which may include jettisoning a body at sea without burial. However, attempts would later be made to recover and bury when possible without life hazard.

An example of the desire to bury a body in the ground even after it has been long dead at sea, is that of the Israeli submarine Dakar which was lost with no survivors in 1968 but whose location was not discovered until 1999 lying broken at a depth of 3,000 meters. Search and recovery of any potentially existing remains at this very difficult to access depth has not shown results despite requests from family and the Chief Rabbi of the Israel Defense Forces. In another case, when the skeletons of Holocaust victims were found in a river into which they had been dumped en masse, authorities claimed that many of these martyrs to the Jewish faith would hope to be brought ashore to rest in proper Jewish burials.

By country

Australia
Burial at sea within Australian territorial waters, exclusive economic zone and continental shelf is covered by the Environmental Protection (Sea Dumping Act) 1981 administered by the federal Department of the Environment. A permit is required for burial of bodies at sea. Permits are usually only granted in cases of a strong connection to the sea, such as long-serving navy personnel. The body must not be embalmed or placed in a casket; it may only be sewn into a shroud. Australian Defence Force vessels engaged in armed conflicts or emergency situations are exempt from these requirements.

No permit is required to scatter ashes at sea.

United Kingdom
British burials at sea of the 18th and 19th century involved wrapping the deceased in sailcloth weighted with cannonballs.

In England, cremated remains may be scattered freely at sea but a burial must be made in a coffin meeting regulatory requirements and in one of three locations: off The Needles, Isle of Wight; between Hastings and Newhaven; and off Tynemouth, North Tyneside. Permission may be sought for another burial site. Some funeral directors will arrange the event, such as Britannia Shipping for Burial At Sea. Charity organisation the Maritime Volunteer Service also helps carry out burials at sea.

In Scotland, there are two designated sites for burial at sea.

United States
A funeral director is not required for the burial of cremated remains at sea. However, full body burials require specific preparation to ensure the body or coffin sinks quickly, and in many states a licensed funeral director is required. The Environmental Protection Agency regulations for full body burials at sea in the United States require that the site of interment be  from land and at a depth of at least . In California, a whole body must be buried at least three miles off the coast. Off the eastern coast of the United States, the closest sufficient depths are off Long Island, Ocracoke, and Miami.

Sufficient depth is within  or less at many harbors along the U.S. west coast, including San Diego, Santa Barbara, Monterey, Fort Bragg, Eureka, and Crescent City, all in California. The United States Navy inters intact remains from Norfolk and San Diego only. The United States Navy requires a metal casket for intact remains, but full body burial in a suitably weighted shroud is also legal.

The United States is similar to many countries which permit the spreading of cremation ashes within their Exclusive Economic zone. When spreading ashes from a ship which is registered in a different country, the regulations and reporting procedures for the ship's flag state need to be complied with once the vessel is in international waters, that is, outside . Ships follow the London Convention principles, as opposed to MARPOL regulations, as the ash is intentionally taken on board for discharge at sea, as opposed to ash generated on passage from the ship's incinerators. It should be further considered that on 1 January 2013, MARPOL Annex V came into force, which prevents discharge of a ship's incinerator ash.

United States Navy

The United States Navy has performed many burials at sea in its history, with wartime burials as recently as World War II, and peacetime burials still common. Enemy deaths received the same ceremony as Americans or allies. Most other armed forces also perform burials at sea, such as the British Royal Navy and the Royal Canadian Navy.

If the deceased died on land or has been returned to shore after death, the remains may be brought aboard either in a coffin or in an urn after cremation. The ceremony is performed while the ship is deployed, and consequently civilians are not allowed to be present. In the US, people eligible for a Navy burial at sea are:
 Active-duty members of the uniformed services
 Retirees and honorably discharged veterans
 Military Sealift Command US civilian marine personnel
 Dependents of active duty members, retirees, and veterans.

In preparation, the officer of the deck calls All hands bury the dead, and the ship is stopped (if possible). The ship's flags are lowered to half mast. The ship's crew, including a firing party, casket bearers and a bugler, are assembled on the deck. The crew stands at parade rest at the beginning of the ceremony. The coffin is covered with a flag, and is carried feet first on deck by the casket bearers. The casket is placed on a stand, with the feet overboard. In case of cremated remains, the urn is brought on deck and placed on a stand.

The ceremony is divided into a military portion and a religious portion. The religious part is specific to the religion of the deceased, and may be performed by a Navy chaplain, or by the commanding officer if no chaplain of the appropriate faith is available. A scripture is read and prayers are said.

After the religious ceremony, the firing party is ordered "Firing party, present arms". The casket bearers tilt the platform with the casket, so that the casket slides off the platform into the ocean. The flag which was draped over the casket is retained on board. For cremated remains, there is the option to bury the remains using the urn in a similar fashion to the procedure used for caskets. Alternatively, the urn can be opened, and the remains scattered in the wind. In this case, the wind direction has to be taken under consideration before burial to ensure a smooth procedure.

The firing party fires a three volley salute, the bugler plays "Taps", and flowers may also be dropped into the ocean. After the flag is folded, the ceremony ends. The relatives are informed of the time and location of the burial, and given photos and video recordings if available.

Wartime burial at sea

In wartime, attempts are made for burial at sea to follow the same procedure as for peacetime burial at sea, although a ship on a combat mission may not have all the necessary resources available. Nowadays, it is usually possible to airlift the remains back to shore, and prepare a burial ceremony on land. However, as recently as the Falklands War, deceased were buried at sea without returning to land. Due to the limited facilities of military ships, this procedure usually does not include a casket, but the body is sewn into a sailcloth with weights, usually rocks or cannonballs. Cremation is usually not possible on a ship. During the Pacific campaign there was at least one instance where a member of an aircrew was buried at sea in his damaged aircraft, which was ceremonially pushed overboard from an aircraft carrier.

Memorial services at sea
If no remains of the deceased are available a memorial service may be held, and flowers may be dropped in the water, often over or near the location of the death.

People buried at sea

A few notable burials at sea:
 Sir Francis Drake (1540–1596), body in lead coffin off the coast of Portobelo, Panama
 Andrew Cunningham, 1st Viscount Cunningham of Hyndhope (1883–1963), prominent admiral of the Royal Navy during World War II. Buried at sea near Portsmouth.
 Christopher Newport (1561–1617), body buried in the Indian Ocean
 Edward Winslow (1595–1655), buried at sea near Jamaica on 8 May 1655
 Friedrich Engels (1820–1895), cremated ashes were scattered off Beachy Head, near Eastbourne England. 
 Numerous  victims (1912), picked up by rescue ships, whose remains were too damaged to preserve or for whom the rescuers lacked sufficient embalming materials, were buried at sea. The ashes of Titanic's fourth officer, Joseph Boxhall, were scattered at sea following his death, aged 83, in 1967, at 41°46N 50°14W, the position he had calculated for the ship on the night of the sinking.
 Edwina Mountbatten, Countess Mountbatten of Burma (1901–1960), was buried at sea from HMS Wakeful off the coast of Portsmouth.
 Mariano Moreno (1778–1811), one of the leaders of the Argentine May Revolution; died on a schooner taking him to exile in Europe; his coffin was wrapped in a Union Jack.
 Surya Sen (1894–1934), was given a burial at sea in the Bay of Bengal
 Dudley Pound (1877–1943), cremated ashes scattered
 H. G. Wells (1866–1946), cremated and ashes scattered in the sea off England
 Adolf Eichmann (1906–1962), following his execution in Israel, his body was cremated and his ashes scattered at sea over the Mediterranean, in international waters. This was done because Israel did not want such a person buried in its soil, and also did not want a grave elsewhere that might have become a place of pilgrimage for other Nazis.
 Zhang Huaxiang (1987–2016), a Chinese nurse who was murdered in Singapore. Her body was cremated and her ashes were scattered at sea. Her killer, Boh Soon Ho, was found guilty of murder and sentenced to life imprisonment.
 Jenny Cheok Cheng Kid (1941–1963), Singaporean murder victim who had gone missing at sea on 27 August 1963 during a scuba diving trip near Sisters' Islands, Singapore. She was later found to be murdered by her boyfriend Sunny Ang for her insurance, which amounted to $450,000. Despite the lack of a body and circumstantial evidence, Ang was convicted of murder and sentenced to death in one of Singapore's sensational trials, and later executed in 1967. Her body has never been found and is presumed buried at sea.
 Janis Joplin (1943–1970), cremated at Westwood Village Memorial Park Cemetery, and ashes scattered into the Pacific Ocean
 Maria Callas (1923–1977), cremated at the Père Lachaise Cemetery in Paris; ashes were interred there, stolen, recovered and finally scattered, according to her wish, into the Aegean Sea in Greece on June 3, 1979
 Richard Rodgers (1902–1979), cremated ashes scattered
 Sir Alfred Hitchcock (1899–1980), ashes were scattered into the Pacific Ocean
 Steve McQueen (1930–1980), cremated and ashes scattered in the Pacific Ocean
 Dennis Wilson (1944–1983), body buried in the Pacific Ocean off California with special intervention by President Reagan
 Peter Lawford (1923–1984), actor, cremated and ashes originally buried at Westwood Village Memorial Park Cemetery; they were later removed and scattered in the Pacific Ocean
 Rock Hudson (1925–1985), cremated ashes scattered
 Robert A. Heinlein (1907–1988), cremated, and ashes scattered in the Pacific Ocean
 Stan Getz (1927–1991), cremated, and ashes scattered in the Pacific Ocean off Malibu, California
 Vincent Price (1911–1993), ashes scattered off Point Dume in Malibu, California
 Gene Kelly (1912–1996), cremated ashes scattered
 Robert Mitchum (1917–1997), cremated ashes scattered
 John F. Kennedy Jr (1960–1999), scattered into the Atlantic Ocean by the U.S. Navy off Martha's Vineyard
 DeForest Kelley (1920–1999), ashes scattered into the Pacific Ocean
 Doug Henning (1947–2000), cremated, and ashes scattered into the Pacific Ocean of Redondo Beach, California
 Werner Klemperer (1920–2000), cremated ashes scattered
 Sir Edmund Hillary (1919–2008), cremated, and ashes scattered in New Zealand's Hauraki Gulf
 Leyla Gencer (1928–2008), ashes scattered into the Bosphorus
 Osama bin Laden (1957–2011); one U.S. official stated that "finding a country willing to accept the remains of the world's most wanted terrorist would have been difficult". It was also done to prevent his burial place from becoming a "terrorist shrine".
 Dick Clark (1929–2012), cremated and ashes were scattered into the Pacific Ocean
 John Carradine (1906–1988), full body burial into the Pacific Ocean near Santa Catalina Island (California) by his family
 Neil Armstrong (1930–2012), cremated, ashes scattered into the Atlantic Ocean from the U.S. Navy cruiser Philippine Sea
 Atholl MacGregor, Hong Kong's chief justice, died on hospital ship from Hong Kong for England
 Robin Williams (1951–2014), cremated the day after his death, ashes scattered in San Francisco Bay
 Liu Xiaobo (1955–2017), 2010 Nobel Peace Prize laureate, ashes scattered into the ocean off north-eastern China.
 Abu Bakr al-Baghdadi (1971–2019), Caliph of the Islamic State of Iraq and the Levant. Remains were buried at sea after Abu Bakr detonated a suicide vest during a raid by US forces; as with bin Laden, the sea burial was carried out according to Islamic rites.

See also
 Illegal disposal of bodies in the water
 Military funeral
 Natural burial
 Viking funeral
 Reef burials

References

External links

Ceremonies
Sea
Naval ceremonies
Funeral transport
 
Water transport